Robert Gaston Fuller (October 22, 1942 – July 18, 1966) was an American rock singer, songwriter, and guitarist best known for "Let Her Dance" and his cover of the Crickets' "I Fought the Law" , recorded with his group The Bobby Fuller Four.

Early life
Born in Baytown, Texas, Fuller was born in the middle of three boys, having a maternal older half-brother, Jack, and a younger brother, Randy. Fuller moved as a small child to Salt Lake City, Utah, where he remained until 1956, when he and his family moved to El Paso, Texas. His father got a job at El Paso Natural Gas at that time. It was the same year that Elvis Presley became popular, and Bobby Fuller became mesmerized by the new rock and roll star. Fuller soon adopted the style of fellow Texan Buddy Holly, fronting a four-man combo and often using original material.

Career

During the early 1960s, he played in clubs and bars in El Paso, and he recorded on independent record labels in Texas with a constantly changing line-up. The only constant band members were Fuller and his younger brother, Randy Fuller (born on January 29, 1944, in Hobbs, New Mexico) on bass.  These independent releases (except two songs recorded at the studio of Norman Petty in Clovis), and an excursion to Yucca Records, also in New Mexico, were recorded in the Fullers' own home studio, with Fuller acting as the producer. He even built a primitive echo chamber in the back yard. The quality of the recordings, using a couple of microphones and a mixing board purchased from a local radio station, was so impressive that he offered the use of his "studio" to local acts for free so he could hone his production skills.

Fuller moved to Los Angeles in 1964 with his band The Bobby Fuller Four and was signed to Mustang Records by producer Bob Keane, who was noted for discovering Ritchie Valens and producing many surf music groups.  By this time, the group consisted of Fuller and his brother Randy on vocals/guitar and bass respectively, Jim Reese on guitar and DeWayne Quirico on drums. This lineup recorded "I Fought The Law". (There are actually two versions of "I Fought The Law" by Fuller, the original hit that was released as a 45-rpm single and the re-recording that was issued on an album. The arrangements are identical, but the vocals by Fuller are slightly different.)

At a time when the British Invasion and folk rock were the dominant genres in rock, Fuller stuck to Buddy Holly's style of classic rock and roll with Tex Mex flourishes. His recordings, both covers and originals, also reveal the influences of Eddie Cochran, The Beatles, Elvis Presley, Little Richard, and The Everly Brothers, as well as surf guitar. Less well known was Fuller's ability to emulate the reverb-laden surf guitar of Dick Dale and The Ventures. His first Top 40 hit was the self-penned "Let Her Dance". His second hit, "I Fought the Law", peaked at No. 9 on the Billboard Hot 100 on March 12–19, 1966. The song was originally written and recorded by Sonny Curtis, who became a member of Buddy Holly's former group The Crickets after Holly's death. The group's third Top 40 single was a cover of Holly's "Love's Made a Fool of You".

Death
Within months of "I Fought the Law" becoming a top 10 hit, Fuller was found dead in an automobile parked outside his Hollywood apartment. The Los Angeles deputy medical examiner, Jerry Nelson, performed the autopsy. According to Dean Kuipers: "The report states that Bobby's face, chest, and side were covered in 'petechial hemorrhages,' probably caused by gasoline vapors and the summer heat. He found no bruises, no broken bones, no cuts. No evidence of beating." Kuipers further explains that boxes for "accident" and "suicide" were checked, but next to the boxes were question marks. Despite the official cause of death, some commentators believe Fuller was murdered.

Erik Greene, a relative of Sam Cooke, has cited similarities in the deaths of Cooke and Fuller. Fuller's bandmate Jim Reese suspected that Charles Manson played a role in Fuller's death, but never provided credible evidence; Manson was in prison from 1961 to 1967. A sensationalist crime website has speculated that the Los Angeles Police Department may have been involved because of Fuller's connection to a Mafia-related woman.

Fuller was buried at Forest Lawn Memorial Park in the Hollywood Hills of Los Angeles. His death was profiled in a segment of Unsolved Mysteries.

His death was also explored in the May 11, 2015, episode of the NPR program All Things Considered. The program references the book I Fought the Law: The Life and Strange Death of Bobby Fuller, by Miriam Linna, with contributions by Randy Fuller. Sometime after the Unsolved Mysteries segment in question initially aired, the cause of Fuller's death was officially changed from "suicide" to "accident".

In popular culture
New York City Celtic rock band Black 47 released a song titled "Who Killed Bobby Fuller" on their second album, Home of the Brave, in 1994, and Atlanta indie rock band The Rock*A*Teens released an identically titled song on their 1996 self-titled debut album. Lou Reed referenced both Bobby Fuller by name and "I Fought the Law" on the track "Dirt" from his 1978 album Street Hassle, as did indie rock band Metric on their 2006 single "Monster Hospital". In 2013, producer and artist Terry Manning released a tribute album to his friend and mentor Bobby Fuller entitled West Texas Skyline. In 2017, Chuck Prophet released an album titled Bobby Fuller Died for Your Sins.

Discography

Studio albums
KRLA King of the Wheels (Mustang M-900 [mono] / MS-900 [stereo], 1965) 5
I Fought The Law (Mustang M-901 [mono] / MS-901 [stereo], 1966) 5

Live albums
 Celebrity Night At PJ's (cancelled — originally to be released as Mustang M-902 [mono] / MS-902 [stereo]; finally issued in the Never To Be Forgotten: The Mustang Years box set) 5

Original US singles
 "You're In Love" // "Guess We'll Fall In Love" (Yucca 45–140, 1961) 1
 "You're In Love" // "Guess We'll Fall In Love" (Yucca 45-140 [re-recordings], 1962) 1
 "Gently My Love" // "My Heart Jumped" (Yucca 45–144, 1962) 2
 "Nervous Breakdown" // "Not Fade Away" (Eastwood NO8W-0344/NO8W-0345, 1962) 2
 "Saturday Night" // "Stringer" (Todd 45–1090, 1963) 2
 "Wine, Wine, Wine" // "King Of The Beach" (Exeter EXT-122, 1964) 2
 "I Fought The Law" // "She's My Girl" (Exeter EXT-124, 1964) 2
 "Fool Of Love" // "Shakedown" (Exeter EXT-126, 1964) 3
 "Those Memories Of You" // "Our Favorite Martian" (Donna 1403, 1964) 3
 "Wolfman" // "Thunder Reef" (Mustang 3003, recorded 1964/released January 1965) 4
 "Take My Word" // "She's My Girl" (Mustang 3004, 1965) 5
 "Let Her Dance" // "Another Sad And Lonely Night" (Mustang 3006, 1965) 5
 "Let Her Dance" // "Another Sad And Lonely Night" (Liberty 55812 [reissue], 1965) 5
 "Let Her Dance" // "Another Sad And Lonely Night" (Mustang 3012 [re-release], 1965) 5
 "Never To Be Forgotten" // "You Kiss Me" (Mustang 3011, 1965) 5
 "I Fought The Law" // "Little Annie Lou" (Mustang 3014, 1965) 5
 "Love's Made a Fool of You" // "Don't Ever Let Me Know" (Mustang 3016, 1966) 5
 "The Magic Touch" // "My True Love" (Mustang 3018, 1966) 5
 "The Magic Touch" // "I'm A Lucky Guy" (Mustang 3018 [alternate issue], 1966) 5
 "It's Love, Come What May" // "It's Love, Come What May" (Mustang 3020 [DJ promo], 1966) 5
 "It's Love, Come What May" [w/Randy Fuller's over-dubbed vocal] // "Wolfman" (Mustang 3020, 1966) 5

Compilations and reissues
 The Bobby Fuller Memorial Album (LP, President 1003, 1968) 5
 The Best Of The Bobby Fuller Four (LP, Rhino RNDF-201, 1981) 5
 KRLA King Of The Wheels (LP, Line LP-5146, 1981) 5
 I Fought The Law (LP, Line LP-5133, 1981) 5
 The Bobby Fuller Memorial Album (LP, Strand 6.24885, 1982) 5
 Let Them Dance (The Rare Sides) (LP, OutLine OLLP-5272, 1983) 5
 Live On Stage (LP, OutLine OLLP-5302, 1983) 5
 I Fought The Law (LP, Eva 12032, 1983) 5
 Live Again (LP, Eva 12046, 1984) 5
 The Bobby Fuller Tapes, Volume One (LP, Rhino RNLP-057, 1983) 2
 The Bobby Fuller Tapes, Volume Two (LP, Voxx 200.028, 1984) 2
 Memories Of Buddy Holly (LP, Rockhouse 8407, 1984) 2
 The Bobby Fuller Instrumental Album (LP, Rockhouse 8504, 1985) 2
 The Best Of The Bobby Fuller Four (CD, Rhino 70174, 1990) 5
 The Bobby Fuller Four (CD, Ace CDCHD-956, 1990) 5
 Live At PJ's...Plus! (CD, Ace CDCHD-314, 1991) 5
 The Best Of The Bobby Fuller Four (CD, Ace CDCHD-388, 1992) 5
 The Bobby Fuller Four (CD, Del-Fi DFCD-70174, 1994) 5
 Shakedown! The Texas Tapes Revisited (2-CD box set, Del-Fi DFBX-2902, 1996) 2
 Never To Be Forgotten: The Mustang Years (3-CD box set, Mustang/Del-Fi DFBX-3903, 1997) 5
 El Paso Rock: Early Recordings, Volume 1 (CD, Norton 252, 1996) 2
 El Paso Rock, Volume 2: More Early Recordings (CD, Norton 260, 1997) 2
 The Mustang Years (2LP, Munster MR-184, 2000) 5
 I Fought The Law And Others (7-inch EP, Munster 7141, 2000) 5
 I Fought The Law: The Best Of The Bobby Fuller Four (CD, Del-Fi/Rhino 71904, 2001) 5 
 I Fought The Law And Other Hits (CD, Flashback/Rhino 78170, 2004) 5 
 Rhino Hi-Five: The Bobby Fuller Four (CD, Rhino 7????, 2006) 5
 Rock And Roll King Of The Southwest: The Best Of The Texas Years 1962-64 (LP, Norton 325, 2007) 2
 Bobby Fuller Live!!! (LP, Norton 326, 2007) 2
 El Paso Rock: Early Recordings, Volume 3 (CD, Norton 318, 2010) 2
 Magic Touch: The Complete Mustang Singles Collection (CD, Now Sounds [UK] WCRNOW-57, 2018) 5

1 Released as by 'Bobby Fuller / Guitarist Jim Reese And The Embers, Vocal'. Note: issued twice with the same catalog number, but with completely different versions of both tracks.
2 Released as by 'Bobby Fuller'.
3 Released as by 'Bobby Fuller And The Fanatics'.
4 Released as by 'The Shindigs'.
5 Released as by 'The Bobby Fuller Four'.

References

External links
 
 [ Bobby Fuller] at AllMusic
 Bobby Fuller at Discogs
 Bobby Fuller entry at Rockabilly Hall of Fame 
 Bobby Fuller Four entry at Classic Bands
 
 Mysterious Deaths: Bobby Fuller, Rock Icon Borderlands (EPCC)

1942 births
1966 deaths
American rock guitarists
American male guitarists
Burials at Forest Lawn Memorial Park (Hollywood Hills)
Norton Records artists
Musicians from El Paso, Texas
Deaths from asphyxiation
University of North Texas alumni
Liberty Records artists
People from Baytown, Texas
Music of Denton, Texas
20th-century American singers
Death conspiracy theories
20th-century American guitarists
20th-century American male singers